Glendale is an unincorporated community in Leiding Township, Saint Louis County, Minnesota, United States.

The community is located immediately south of Orr at the junction of U.S. Highway 53 and Saint Louis County Road 23 (Nett Lake Road).

Glendale is located within the Kabetogama State Forest.

References

Unincorporated communities in Minnesota
Unincorporated communities in St. Louis County, Minnesota